Jichang Road Subdistrict is a subdistrict of Lubei District, Tangshan, Hebei, People's Republic of China. , it had 17 residential communities under its administration.

See also
List of township-level divisions of Hebei

References

Township-level divisions of Hebei
Tangshan